Sir Richard Collas (born 1953, Guernsey) was   Bailiff of Guernsey.

After studying engineering and accountancy, he moved to law in which he practised for a number of years before moving into the civic duty of Deputy Bailiff. He held the office of the Bailiff of Guernsey from 2012 until 2020. He was succeeded by Richard McMahon.

Early life
He was educated at Elizabeth College (Guernsey), before he went on to study Engineering Science at Jesus College, Oxford.

Career
He joined Lever Brothers Limited before completed the exams for the Institute of Cost and Management Accountants then, in 1980, changed to Law as a profession.

Called to the English Bar at Gray's Inn in 1982 he returned to Guernsey to attend the University of Caen Normandy for the necessary Certificat d’Études Juridtiques Françaises et Normandes and the following year was admitted as a Royal Court Advocate. Joining his father's firm of Collas Day & Rowland, Advocates, he became a partner and continued to practise there until 2005.

Collas was appointed to the office of Deputy Bailiff 2005–2012. In March 2012 he was sworn in and became the 89th Bailiff of Guernsey, taking over the position of Bailiff from Sir Geoffrey Rowland.

The Bailiff of Guernsey is ex-officio President of the Guernsey Court of Appeal. He has been a member of the Court of Appeal of Jersey since 2012.

Collas was awarded a knighthood in June 2014, receiving his knighthood as a Knight Bachelor of the British Empire at an investiture in Buckingham Palace the following November.

He became an Honorary Master of the Bench of The Honourable Society of Gray's Inn in 2015.

The Bailiff would normally retire at the age of 65; however, Her Majesty has granted a two-year extension of the date to May 2020.

Family
Sir Richard has three children, Jonathan, Oliver and Lydia.

See also

 Courts of Guernsey
 List of Bailiffs of Guernsey

References

Bailiffs of Guernsey
People educated at Elizabeth College, Guernsey
Knights Bachelor
Living people
Members of Gray's Inn
Judiciary of Jersey
1953 births
Alumni of Jesus College, Oxford